John Thomas Jones (25 November 1916 – 1978) was a Welsh footballer. A goalkeeper, he was known as "Jones the Cap".

Career
Jones joined Port Vale as an amateur in July 1936, and signed professional forms that December. Working as understudy to Allan Todd, he played just four games – three in the Third Division North and one in the FA Cup, and was given a free transfer in April 1937. He then moved on to Northampton Town and Oldham Athletic.

Career statistics
Source:

References

1916 births
1978 deaths
Association football goalkeepers
Brentford F.C. wartime guest players
English Football League players
Northampton Town F.C. players
Oldham Athletic A.F.C. players
People from Holywell, Flintshire
Sportspeople from Flintshire
Port Vale F.C. players
Welsh footballers